Roche Braziliano (sometimes spelled Rock, Roch, Roc, Roque, Brazilliano, Brasiliaan or Brasiliano) (c. 1630 – disappeared c. 1671) was a Dutch Brazilian pirate born in the town of Groningen. His pirate career lasted from 1654 until his disappearance around 1671. He was first made famous in Alexandre Exquemelin's 1678 book The Buccaneers of America; Exquemelin did not know Braziliano's real name, but historians have found he was probably born as Gerrit Gerritszoon and that he and his parents moved to Dutch-controlled Brazil. He is known as "Roche Braziliano", which in English translates to "Rock the Brazilian", due to his long exile in Brazil.

Pirate career
Roche Braziliano was a notoriously cruel buccaneer who operated out of Port Royal, Jamaica. He was a privateer in Bahia, Brazil, before moving to Port Royal in 1654. He led a mutiny and adopted the life of a buccaneer. On his first adventure he captured a ship of immense value and brought it back safely to Jamaica. He eventually was caught and sent to Spain, but he escaped with threats of vengeance from his followers. He soon resumed his criminal career, purchasing a new ship from fellow pirate François l'Olonnais and later sailing in company with Sir Henry Morgan and Joseph Bradley among others. Braziliano's first mate Yellows eventually became a captain in his own right, sailing with Braziliano, Morgan, and others in raids against the Spanish.

Atrocities
Drunken and debauched, Braziliano would threaten to shoot anyone who did not drink with him. He roasted alive two Spanish farmers on wooden spits after they refused to hand over their pigs. He treated his Spanish prisoners barbarously, typically cutting off their limbs or roasting them alive over a fire.

Fate
After 1671, Braziliano was never seen or heard from again. To this day, nobody knows what became of the Dutch pirate. Whether he (and his vessel and men) were lost at sea in a brutal storm, was secretly captured, or possibly retired and lived the rest of his life in anonymity is a matter of debate.

Popular culture
A pirate named Roc Brasiliano was portrayed by Anthony Quinn in the 1952 swashbuckler film Against All Flags.
Roche Braziliano is one of the pirates featured in the game Sid Meier's Pirates!
The ghost of Captain Roche is found as a boss battle in Abbey Games' Renowned Explorers: International Society.
May be the namesake of the One Piece character Rocks D. Xebec.
"Rock Braziliano" is featured in the Boardgame "Tortuga 1667" as a playable character

See also
List of people who disappeared mysteriously at sea

References

General
Pickering, David. "Pirates". CollinsGem. HarperCollins Publishers, New York, NY. pp-52, 201. 2006.

Specific

External links
 Pirates Hold
 Privateer Dragons of the Caribbean
 It all began with piracy

1630 births
1670s deaths
1670s missing person cases
17th-century Dutch people
17th-century Jamaican people
17th-century pirates
Dutch privateers
Dutch pirates
Mutineers
People from Groningen (city)
People from Pernambuco
People lost at sea
People of Dutch Brazil
Year of death unknown